Kfar Baram synagogue, also Kafar Berem synagogue, is the ruins of two ancient Jewish synagogues at the site of Kafr Bir'im, a depopulated Palestinian village which in medieval times was the Jewish village of Kfar Bar'am. Today, it is located in Northern Israel, 3 kilometers from the Lebanese border.

The façade of the 3rd-century synagogue faces south, towards Jerusalem, as the custom of most synagogues, and was replete with a covered portico containing six stone columns.

It was first identified as a synagogue in modern times in 1852 – along with other similar remains in Galilee – by Edward Robinson in his Biblical Researches in Palestine.

Etymology
The name is often assumed to mean "Son of the People," incorporating the Aramaic word bar בר, meaning "son" and the Hebrew word am עם meaning "people". However, if like at Shfar'am, both elements are Hebrew, the name could derive from a literary Hebrew word בר indicating cleanliness, purity, pristineness and wholesomeness - "The wholesome people" or "wholesomeness of the people".

History

Kafr Bir'im was established in ancient times. According to Jewish tradition, Pinchas ben Yair (2nd-century CE) was buried in Kfar Bir'im. After a period of Muslim inhabitation, by the 19th century the village was entirely Christian, comprising Maronites and Melkites. A church on the site, the Maronite church, was in regular use.

The village was badly damaged in the  Galilee earthquake of 1837. The local church and a row of columns and other standing remains of the ancient synagogue were thrown to the ground. 

Along with other such structures in the Galilee, the ruins were first identified as a synagogue in modern times in 1852 by Edward Robinson in his Biblical Researches in Palestine. Robinson wrote of his visit to Kafr Bir'im:
As these remains were the first of the kind that we had yet seen; and were of a style of architecture utterly unknown to us ; we were at a loss for some time what to make of them. They were evidently neither Greek nor Roman. The inscription, if authentic, obviously marks both structures as of Jewish origin ; and as such, they could only have been synagogues. We were, however, not satisfied on this point, until we found at Meirôn the same species of architecture, in the acknowledged remains of an ancient Jewish synagogue. We afterwards found the ruins of like structures at Irbid, Tell Hum, Kedes, and perhaps other places in Galilee; all marked with the same architectural peculiarities. The size, the elaborate sculptured ornament, and the splendour of these edifices, do not belong to a scattered and down-trodden people ; such as the Jews have been in these regions ever since the fourth century. These costly synagogues, therefore, can be referred only to the earlier centuries of the Christian era ; when Galilee was the chief seat of the Jews ; and Jewish learning and schools flourished at Tiberias. All these circumstances would seem to mark a condition of prosperity and wealth and influence among the Jews of Galilee in that age, of which neither their own historians, nor any other, have given us any account.
 
The village was captured October 31, 1948 by the Israel Defense Forces during operation Hiram and the villagers forced to leave.  In 1949, due to frequent cross-border infiltration, they were barred from returning to the border zone. On June 16, 1949, Kibbutz Bar'am was founded nearby by demobilized Palmach soldiers.

Archaeology

The Kfar Bar'am synagogue is preserved up to the second story and has been restored.  The architecture is similar to that of other synagogues in the Galilee built in the Talmudic period. In 1522, Rabbi Moses Basula wrote that the synagogue belonged to Simeon bar Yochai, who survived the Second Jewish War in 132-135 CE (the Bar-Kochba revolt). Archaeologists, however, have concluded that the building was built at least a century later. According to another tradition, the synagogue was built in honor of Rabbi Shimon bar Yochai, and bore his name. Israeli archaeologist Lipa Sukenik (1889–1953), who was instrumental in establishing the Department of Archaeology at the Hebrew University, excavated a relief in one of the synagogues in 1928, and dated the Bar’am synagogue to the 3rd century CE.

The synagogue is made of basalt stone, standard for most buildings in the area, and its façade faces south, towards Jerusalem, as the custom of most synagogues. The six-column portico is unusual. The front entrance of the synagogue has three doorways that face Jerusalem. In front of the entrance are some of the (originally eight) columns with Attic bases which supported a porch. There is an inscription under the right window on the facade, which reads: "Banahu Elazar bar Yodan", which means "Elazar bar Yodan built it". Elazar bar Yodan is a Jewish Aramaic name.  The interior of the synagogue was divided by rows of columns into three aisles and an ambulatory.

An unusual feature in an ancient synagogue  is the presence of three-dimensional sculpture, a pair of stone lions. A similar pair of three-dimensional lions was found at Chorazin. A carved frieze features a winged victory and images of animals and, possibly, human figures.

There was a second, smaller synagogue, but little of it was found. A lintel from this smaller synagogue is at the Louvre.  The Hebrew inscription on the lintel reads, ''"Peace be upon the place, and on all the places of Israel."

In 1901, publication of photos of the ancient synagogue led the Jewish Hospital of Philadelphia, (now the Albert Einstein Medical Center,) to erect a synagogue, the Henry S. Frank Memorial Synagogue, inspired by Bar'am and other ancient Israeli synagogues.  The hospital's synagogue replicated the round arch of the door of the standing ruin and the lintel from the smaller synagogue that is now in the Louvre.

See also
Ancient synagogues in the Palestine region
Ancient synagogues in Israel
Archaeology of Israel
Bar'am National Park
Oldest synagogues in the world

Bibliography

References

External links
 Bar'am synagogue (Talmudic period)
 Ancient Synagogues in Bar'am and Capernaum  article written by Jacqueline Schaalje, from Jewish Magazine, June 2001 Edition
 Bar’am National Park, an ancient synagogue and a Maronite church
 Coexistence - Kafar Berem article written by Hanna F. Farah

Archaeological sites in Israel
Ancient synagogues in the Land of Israel
Esther
History of Purim